Global Media & Entertainment Limited, trading as Global, is a British media company formed in 2007. It is the owner of the largest commercial radio company in Europe having expanded through a number of historical acquisitions, including Chrysalis Radio, GCap Media and GMG Radio. Global owns and operates seven core radio brands, all employing a national network strategy, including Capital, Heart, Classic FM, and LBC.

Global also owns and operates one of the leading out-of-home advertising (OOH) companies in the UK through its Outdoor Division.

History
Global was founded by Ashley Tabor-King in 2007, with financial backing from his father Michael Tabor, and purchased Chrysalis Radio, where Global took control of the radio brands Heart, Galaxy, LBC and The Arrow. A year later on 31 October 2008 Global Radio officially took control of all GCap Media and its brands. The GCap Media name was dropped at this time. The GCap purchase gave Global the network of FM stations which GCap had operated as The One Network (many of which are now part of the Heart or Capital networks), plus Classic FM, XFM, Choice FM, Gold and Chill.

Following the acquisition of GCap Media, Global was required to sell off a number of stations in the Midlands. The stations were bought by Orion Media, headed by Phil Riley, former Chief Executive of Chrysalis Radio.

Heritage local radio stations in areas not already served by Heart FM were gradually rebranded and incorporated into a larger Heart Network that covers most of southern England and parts of North Wales – the stations which would become Heart in the North were acquired later. The remaining stations briefly formed The Hit Music Network before being merged with the Galaxy network and Capital London into the Capital network.

On 25 June 2012, Global acquired GMG Radio for a sum thought to be between £50 and £70 million; it continued to be run separately while a regulatory review was conducted. In May 2013, the Competition Commission ruled that Global would be required to sell seven stations across the network.

The company initially offered to dispose of three stations, Real XS in Manchester and Scotland, and Gold in the East Midlands, to try to prevent the sale of the seven stations mentioned in the ruling. When this failed Global Radio launched an appeal against the decision.

The appeal was based on three grounds: (a) Real and Smooth as alternatives to the Greater Manchester stations, (b) reliance on "significant adverse effects" in the North-West (c) Global's remedy proposal (see above). The appeal was rejected on all grounds and the company must sell the seven stations it was ordered to in the original judgement, Global said it was disappointed with the decision and was considering it further.

On 6 February 2014, it was announced that a number of stations would be sold to the Irish broadcaster Communicorp, with programming generally to be supplied by Global under contract. The deal involved control of Smooth Radio in the North East, the North West and the West Midlands, of Capital in South Wales and Scotland, of Real Radio in North Wales and Yorkshire, and of Real XS in Manchester. Most stay under their current brands though the Real stations will be renamed Heart and carry the Heart network off-peak programming as provided by Global. Global will retain control of all other stations, relaunching the existing Heart North West and Wales as Capital to allow Real North Wales (under Communicorp) to take on the Heart affiliation. Real XS in Paisley will be retained by Global and join the XFM network; the future branding and direction of Real XS in Manchester, under Communicorp, is unclear at the present time. Most of the Gold stations switched to taking the Smooth London/Network output, with the exception that, in areas where Smooth is available on FM (London, Manchester and the East Midlands), a reduced Gold oldies service will remain, run by Global and taking programmes from London as now.

It was announced in June 2015 that Darren Singer would be appointed as Global's chief financial officer.

In February 2017, Global changed its company name from 'This is Global Limited' to 'Global Media & Entertainment Limited'. It also changed all its social media handles from 'thisisglobal' to 'global' and its web domain to global.com. Global also combined the three sub-companies, Global Radio, Global Entertainment and Global Television into just 'Global'.

On 1 March 2018, Global launched a brand new awards show called The Global Awards celebrating the stars of music, news & entertainment across genres in the UK and from around the world. It took place at London's Eventim Apollo.  

In September 2018, Global announced the double acquisition of two key outdoor companies, Primesight and Outdoor Plus, creating Global's Outdoor Division. The acquisitions were rumoured to be worth several hundred million pounds.

On 19 September 2018, rival commercial radio group Bauer announced that they were pulling out of the biggest networked commercial radio chart show, The Official Vodafone Big Top 40, produced by Global's Capital. The move led to Global discontinuing the Sunday evening show for all stations outside of their own Heart and Capital networks, on which the show continues to air.

On 26 February 2019, Global Radio announced plans to replace the regional breakfast shows on Capital and Heart with a single national breakfast show for each network, whilst Smooth kept its regional breakfast shows, instead turning its drive time show national. Capital's new breakfast show launched in April with Roman Kemp, Heart breakfast with Jamie Theakston and Amanda Holden launched in June and Smooth Drivetime with Angie Grieves launched in September. 

In September 2019, it was announced that Quidem, the owners of Banbury Sound, Rugby FM and Touch FM had entered into a brand-licensing agreement with Global Radio. This change will see the Quidem stations rebrand under the Global brands. At the beginning of October, Ofcom opened a consultation following Quidem's request for its six stations to make significant changes to their formats.

On 20 December 2021 it was announced that Global has acquired the UK podcast hosting, distribution and monetisation startup, Captivate with founders Mark Asquith and Kieran McKeefery joining the Global team in order to continue to grow Global's presence in the digital audio and podcasting space.

Radio stations

Capital

The Capital network consists of eleven contemporary hit stations which currently broadcast in numerous areas of England, Wales and central Scotland, alongside a digital UK-wide version. On 3 January 2011, Capital London, The Hit Music Network and the Galaxy network became part of the nine-station Capital radio network; two former Heart stations became Capital in May 2014. Local news hours were extended as part of the agreement to increase programme-sharing, and advertising remains locally sold. Programming outside local hours originates from Capital's network studios in Leicester Square, London. Unlike its competitor BBC Radio 1, Capital only plays pop music and dance music and does not play rock music, alternative music or classic hits.

Capital Dance

Capital Dance is a national digital radio station operated as a spin-off from the main Capital station. The station broadcasts from studios at Leicester Square in London alongside its sister stations Capital and Capital Xtra. The station predominantly plays contemporary electronic dance music.

Capital Xtra

An urban music station based in London, originally named Choice FM. Until Summer 2010 it was sold as part of the Galaxy network for marketing purposes only, but retained its own separate branding and programming. From then on, with Galaxy ultimately absorbed into Capital, Choice was a separate station within Global's line-up. On 7 October 2013 Choice FM was rebranded as Capital XTRA and made available nationally via DAB radio.

Capital Xtra Reloaded

Capital Xtra Reloaded broadcasts from Birmingham and is available on DAB+ in London and online via Global Player. Its output consists primarily of hip-hop, dance, garage, R&B and grime classics from the 1990s and 2000s.

Heart

Heart is a network of 21 adult contemporary stations which currently broadcasts in numerous areas of England, Wales and central Scotland, alongside a digital UK-wide version. The network began with a single regional station in the West Midlands and subsequently a second station in London. The third station, Heart 106 in the East Midlands (previously Century 106) was sold to Orion Media and run as a franchise retaining the Heart name until the start of 2011, when it was rebranded as Gem 106. 

In 2009 many of the heritage CHR stations which had formed part of the One Network were renamed Heart, as were Ocean and South Hams Radio (which were not part of the One Network). Heart Hertfordshire is owned by Communicorp and uses the Heart name and format under licence from Global; Heart South Devon is partly owned by UKRD Group; and Heart stations in North Wales and Yorkshire (both formerly Real Radio licences) are operated by Communicorp; all other Heart stations are wholly Global-owned. All of the Real Radio stations were rebranded as Heart on 6 May 2014. Heart is also available on DAB in some areas where there is not a local Heart station on FM; these areas generally receive Heart UK, which is a relay of Heart London. Heart has five sister stations: Heart 70s, Heart 80s, Heart 90s, Heart 00s and Heart Dance.

Classic FM

Classic FM is a classical music station broadcast nationally on FM and DAB, and also available on Freesat, Sky, Freeview and Virgin Media. It is one of three Independent National Radio franchises, and the only one to broadcast on FM.

Smooth

Acquired as part of the takeover of Real & Smooth Ltd, Smooth Radio broadcasts soft adult contemporary music on FM in six areas, and from March 2014 on MW in a number of areas previously served by Gold. After taking over Smooth, Global reversed the "national" format that Smooth had taken in 2010 – whereby a network version of the station was broadcast nationally on DAB with all English FM stations sharing this content – and reintroduced local breakfast and drivetime shows. Two of the Smooth areas had previously been Jazz FM stations, and three had originally been Saga stations; the North-East service launched as Smooth on a licence originally awarded to Saga.

LBC

LBC is a news and talk radio station, focussing on stories and issues from across the UK and internationally by phone-in discussion programmes. It launched on 8 October 1973 as the UK's first licensed commercial radio station, with Capital Radio launching a week later on 16 October. Since 2014, LBC has been broadcasting nationally on DAB, television and Global Player, and FM in London only.

LBC News

On 28 October 2019, what had been LBC London News changed its name to LBC News. As well as remaining on 1152 AM in the London area, it is also available on DAB+ via the D1 multiplex nationwide, using the space vacated by Radio X switching to DAB+. It has reverted to a 24-hour station, dropping its simulcast of LBC, but otherwise keeping the same format of rolling twenty minute bulletins, but with a UK wide focus. Its news presenters include Lisa Aziz and Martin Stanford, whilst John Kettley is one of the weather presenters.

Radio X

Radio X (formerly XFM) broadcasts alternative rock and independent music. It began officially in 1997 as an independent London station, it was purchased by Capital Radio Group (now Global) in 1998. Radio X is available nationally on DAB+ digital radio, Global Player, Virgin Media channel 960, Sky channel 113, and on FM in London 104.9 and Manchester 97.7.

Gold

A network of stations principally dedicated to music from the 1950s to the 1980s, there are two different variants of the station; England and Scotland, and Wales. Many of these were the AM sister stations to heritage CHR stations which are now Heart or Capital stations, though Gold Manchester was originally a standalone station Fortune 1458 and Lite AM before becoming part of the Big-AM and later Capital Gold networks. On DAB, Gold is available in some areas which do not have Gold on AM; in these areas Gold UK is carried. Global chose to close some unviable AM relays of Gold, but has continued to serve these areas on DAB. In the West Midlands, after the divesture of some radio holdings to Orion Media, the Gold brand continued as a franchise, however, in late 2012 these stations were rebranded as Free Radio 80s and no longer carried Gold network programming.

Most Gold stations on AM/local DAB transferred to receive their network programming provision from Smooth Radio on 24 March 2014; local news, travel and advertising drop-ins into the network programming feed continue as previously provided under Gold, and the former Gold stations in Wales continue to offer a four-hour local show as Smooth Wales. Three Gold areas where Smooth is already provided on FM – London, Manchester and the East Midlands – retain a reduced Gold service on AM and (bar Manchester, where capacity is unavailable) local DAB, with most presented shows (aside from a daily morning show) ceasing.

A number of areas gained or regained Gold as a DAB service in September 2015 in space vacated by XFM, following XFM's move from local to national transmission as Radio X.

Streaming-only stations
Global currently operates five stations exclusively broadcast via web-based platforms:

Smooth Extra
Smooth Extra launched at the end of 2014 to broadcast nationally on Digital One (in the slot previously occupied by the network Smooth Radio service) with a 'melodic music from past decades' format (some programming is simulcast with Smooth London). A previous plan to launch a service of "music from the 70s, 80s and 90s" in the Digital One capacity ultimately did not go ahead. Smooth added two further digital siblings on 3 September 2019; Smooth Country (previously a Global Player stream) and Smooth Chill, the successor to Chill. 

A pop-up digital Christmas music station, Smooth Christmas, was operated by R&S in the run-up to Christmas of 2011 and 2012, and having not run in 2013 was revived by Global in 2014 but was in 2015.
In 2016, Smooth Christmas was not revived, instead Heart Extra Xmas, a pop-up digital Christmas music station, appeared from 12 November 2016 until 27 December 2016. It returned on 9 November 2017.

Heart Brand
Heart Extra launched in February 2016, followed by Heart 80s in March 2017; the conversion of these stations to DAB+ in 2019 permitted the launch of further stations including Heart Dance, Heart 70s, Heart 90s and Heart 00s in 2022.

PopBuzz
PopBuzz is a cultural platform of interviews, articles, podcast, videos, and GIFs, combined with a music stream of the fastest trending tracks in social media with digital goodness from around the web. It also has an online radio station called PopBuzz Radio. PopBuzz podcast is released weekly. PopBuzz Presents, introduced in 2017, is an original live program produced in partnership with Twitter. Founded in 2014, the site is targeted to millennials and Gen Zs.

We The Unicorns
We The Unicorns is a platform that brings stories from YouTube and online videos. They make specialised content for fans such as videos, quizzes and interviews. The site evolved from PopBuzz.

Events
Global produce over 150 events for its radio brands annually. These include Capital's Summertime Ball and Jingle Bell Ball, Heart Live and Classic FM Live at the Royal Albert Hall. It also produces its own Global Awards, which recognizes the most popular songs across its radio stations.

In March 2018, Global launched a new awards show (The Global Awards) celebrating the stars of music, news and entertainment across genres in the UK and from around the world.

Global Academy
The Global Academy UTC opened on 12 September 2016 and is sponsored by Global and University of the Arts London. It is located on the site of the Old Vinyl Factory in Hayes, Hillingdon.

On 20 January 2017, The Global Academy was officially opened by the Duke of Cambridge and Prince Harry. Two Breakfast shows from the Global brands were broadcasting Live from the academy, Heart London Breakfast with Jamie Theakston and Emma Bunton and Nick Ferrari on LBC.

Global's Newsroom
All of Global's stations broadcast news updates under the name Global's Newsroom. Local and national bulletins are produced and Global's Newsroom also provides the news to Global's news station LBC. In terms of weekly audience reach, Global's Newsroom is the second largest news broadcaster in the UK, second only to the BBC.

The Global Awards

The Global Awards which started on 1 March 2018 are held by Global and reward music played on its own stations. The Global Awards returned in 2019.

List of ceremonies

Charity
Global's Make Some Noise is Global's in-house charity.

Every year Global's Make Some Noise has an annual appeal day where its radio stations come together to raise money for small projects supporting youngsters and their families living with illness, disability or lack of opportunity, in their local communities.

Before Global's Make Some Noise, some of Global's stations ran their own charity's such as Help a Capital Child, Have a Heart and the Classic FM Foundation.

In 1975, Capital FM's charity Help a London Child was established by the late Sir Richard Attenborough, to help disadvantaged young people in the capital. He once said: “Disadvantaged children don't have less imagination, just less opportunity to express it.”

In 2014, Global's Make Some Noise was formed. 9 October it was Make Some Noise day, where all of Global's brands came together. Make Some Noise raised more than 1 million pounds.

In 2015, Global's Make Some Noise ran its second year on 8 October they came all came together. They raised £1,955,869.

In 2016, Global's Make Some Noise returned on 7 October. In total £2,860,897 was raised. In the financial year 2016-2017 £0.98M was spent by Global Charities on fund raising.

In 2017, Global's Make Some Noise returned on 6 October and raised a record breaking £3,534,628.

Criticism
In February 2009, Global and LBC were the subject of criticism by technical and scientific bloggers following their threat of legal action against medical journalist Ben Goldacre for publishing part of an LBC 97.3 broadcast by Jeni Barnett on his website. The move was interpreted as an attempt to suppress criticism and debate rather than enforcement of copyright. The broadcast itself was described as irresponsible by David Aaronovitch in The Times, and LBC and Barnett were specifically identified in a critical Early Day Motion by Norman Lamb MP.

In May 2015, Global was criticised for dropping coverage of the HSBC tax story in February that year. Coverage of the story was resumed "some days later".

In July 2020, Global was criticised for failing to investigate multiple online allegations that Capital Xtra DJ Tim Westwood had behaved inappropriately with young female fans.

See also
 Timeline of Global Radio

References

External links

 (IIH Global)
PopBuzz official website
 Heart official website
 Smooth Radio official website

Radio broadcasting companies of the United Kingdom
Mass media companies established in 2007